Hunderfossen may refer to:
 Hunderfossen, a village in Lillehammer, Norway
 Hunderfossen Station
 Hunderfossen Familiepark
 Hunderfossen (waterfall)
 Lillehammer Olympic Bobsleigh and Luge Track